Illés Bródy (December 27, 1899 – November 11, 1953)<ref
name="NYT obit"> </ref> was a Hungarian-born journalist and writer who lived in the United States from the 1930s. After a false start as a portrait artist, he became known as a food writer and gourmet. For his writing career his preferred spelling of his own name was Iles Brody; other sources sometimes anglicized his name as Elias Brody.

Early life
Brody was born in Budapest, Hungary, the youngest son of writers Sándor Bródy and Isabella Rosenfeld. His family was Jewish. After serving in the Hungarian cavalry in his youth, he travelled extensively throughout Europe.

In 1927, he married American Follies dancer Vera "Kittens" Leightmer (née Robertson, 1899–1997). The couple had met in Paris, married  in Budapest, and settled in New York City, but the marriage proved tumultuous and ended in divorce in 1932: Brody (then described as a portrait artist) had reportedly bashed Leightmer prior to their engagement, and attempted suicide several times during the course of their relationship. The couple was also involved in a highly publicized court case when Leightmer unsuccessfully sued a prominent American banker, Jefferson Seligman, for breach of promise.

In 1932, after separating from Leightmer, Brody was convicted in London, England of blackmailing two American sisters, Mildred Reid Burke and Constance Reid Netcher. Although he maintained his innocence, he was jailed for ten months and was deported from England after serving his sentence.

In 1938, after returning to the U.S., he married Marie Hollingsworth in Virginia. This marriage appears to have also ended in divorce prior to 1949.

Later writing career
In the late 1930s, Brody returned to New York City, where he became a regular columnist for  Esquire magazine. As a former cavalry officer, his early contributions were on   equestrian sports and horsemanship. He later became a food writer, with a long-running column called "Man the Kitchenette", which – somewhat unusually for the era – offered culinary advice intended for a male readership. He also wrote  for Gourmet magazine.

Brody published two books relating to gastronomy: On the Tip of My Tongue (1944) and The Colony: Portrait of a Restaurant and its Famous Recipes (1945), a history of the noted New York restaurant.

American critic E.V. Durling described it as "the most brilliantly written book so far dealing with the lives and loves of the Duke and Duchess." Other reactions were less favorable: the British tabloid The People denounced the work as "scurrilous", called attention to Brody's 1932 blackmail conviction, and discouraged Brody's prospective British publishers from publishing the book in Britain. Brody had struggled for three years to find a U.S. publisher for Gone with the Windsors, and was reportedly pressured by associates of the Duke and Duchess not to publish the book. The Duchess of Windsor is reported to have expressed relief when Brody died shortly after its publication.

Death
Brody died suddenly of a heart attack on November 11, 1953, while staying at the Palace Hotel in San Francisco. He was survived by his third wife, Sanna Klaveness, whom he had married in 1949.

Bibliography
 On the Tip of My Tongue (1944)
 The Colony (1945)
 Gone with the Windsors (1953)

Notes

References

External links
Works by Iles Brody at Hathi Trust

1953 deaths
Writers from Budapest
Hungarian emigrants to the United States
1899 births
20th-century Hungarian people
Hungarian male writers
People convicted of blackmail
Hungarian expatriates in France